Božin Pavlovski (Macedonian: Божин Павловски) is a Macedonian-Australian novelist whose works have been translated into more than twenty languages.  He has lived in Australia for the past three decades and is in the prime of his creative life. He is a novelist–mediator between two cultures whose novels interpret the binary logic by which his characters are both “here” and in the country in which they were born or originate from. In his latest novel 'Gardener, Desert’ (2015), Pavlovski transmits through a Romanesque lens his vision of the transnational, cosmopolitan, multilingual and hybrid map of the world.

He was born in Žvan, Demir Hisar, Macedonia, on January 7, 1942. He has lived in the former Yugoslavia and the United States, but he has been based in Melbourne, Australia, since 1990. Pavlovski studied literature at the University of Skopje and graduated in 1971. For over thirty years he was editor and publisher of world literature in the former Yugoslavia. Since 1989, he has divided his time as a professional novelist traveling between Europe and Australia.

Bozin Pavlovski's novels, particularly those he has written since he has adopted Australia as his second homeland, unveil the phenomena of reterritorialized cultures and describe the meetings, conversations and thoughts of two or sometimes more cultures, communities, and languages which exist in a single space. Pavlovski's novels can be said to be a part of a transnational literature which has an increasing importance in a contemporary world whose significant characteristics are those of dislocation and relocation, and from where stems his writing between histories, geographies and cultural practices.

Literary works

Novels

Miladin from China (1967)
Duva and The Flea (1973)
West Aust (1977)
The Red Hypocrite (1984)
The Neighboring Owl (1987)
Return to Fairy Tales (1989)
Eagle Coat of Arms (1997)
Journey with My Beloved (2000)
Dreaming on the Road (2001)
A Novel for My Departure (2003)
The Agony of Macedonia (2004)
The Milk of Human Kindness (2005)
The Beauty and The Marauder (2006)
Winter in Summer (2007)
Call Me Hi Goodbye (2008)
Shining Creek (2010)
The Horn of Love (2013)
Gardener, Desert (2015)

Short stories and non-fiction

 (1964)
 (1967)
 (1971)
Collection of short stories (1980)
 (2002)
 (2003)
 (2005)

Recognitions and awards

In 1988, Bozin Pavlovski was elected as a member of Macedonian Academy of Sciences and Arts in the Department of Literature.

His works have more than 50 foreign editions and more than 160 Macedonian editions.

Pavlovski has won numerous foreign and Macedonian literary awards including the Interbalkan Award for Literature in Greece (2002). Other literary awards include:

1962 First prize for short story (Skopje)
1967 First prize for the novel 'Miladin from China' (Belgrade)
1973 'Ratsinovo Priznanie' for the novel 'Duva and the Flea' (Veles)
1976 Grand Prix for best scenario for the documentary film  'Australia, Australia' (Belgrade)
1978 '11 October' Award for the novel 'West Aust'
1980 'Pechalbarska Povelba' for the novel 'West Aust' (Vevcani)
1982 'Goceva Povelba' for the novel 'The Red Hypocrite' (Podgorci)
1985 Golden Medal for literary activities (Belgrade)
1987 'Zelezara Susak' for the novel 'The Neighboring Owl' (Zagreb)
1987 'Kocho Ratcin' Award for the novel 'The Neighboring Owl' (Skopje)
1987 'Stale Popov' Award for the novel 'The Neighboring Owl' (Skopje)
1996 'Goceva Povelba' for the novel 'Eagle Coat of Arms' (Podgorci)
2002 Interbalkan Award for Literature in Greece for the novel 'Journey With My Beloved' (Thessaloniki)
2003 Award for Best Selling Novel - 'Dreaming on the Road' (Skopje International Book Fair)
2004 Award for Best Selling Novel - 'The Agony' (Skopje International Book Fair)
2006 'Ratsinovo Priznanie' for the novel 'The Beauty and The Marauder' (Veles)
2007 'Excelsior' for the novel 'The Beauty and The Marauder' in Romania (Kurtea de Arges)
2008 '11 October' Award for the opus (Skopje)
2010 'Duhoven Voin' Award for literature (Struga)
2014 'Prozni majstori' Award for the novel 'The Horn of Love' 
2014 'Stale Popov' Award for the novel 'The Horn of Love'

References

External links
Bozin Pavlovski Official Website

1942 births
Living people
People from Demir Hisar Municipality
Yugoslav writers
20th-century male writers
Macedonian writers
Ss. Cyril and Methodius University of Skopje alumni